Camp Columbia was a United States Army military camp located in Wacol, near Brisbane, Queensland, Australia. It was built during World War II to accommodate American troops. The Sixth US Army Headquarters was stationed there and it was an Officer Candidate School from 1942 to 1945. After World War II, it was used by the Australian military and then served as a migrant reception and training center. The camp was then known as the "Wacol East Dependants Holding Camp for Displaced Persons". The old Wacol Army Barracks had been converted into the Wacol Military Museum.

See also
 Other places named Camp Columbia

References

External links 
 CAMP COLUMBIA AT WACOL IN BRISBANE DURING WW2
 Former Wacol Army Base

Closed installations of the United States Army
Wacol, Queensland
Queensland in World War II